Bahro Suryoyo ("the Syriac light") is a magazine founded in 1979 by the Syriac (Aramean) Federation of Sweden in Sweden It is published in five languages: Swedish, Aramaic, Arabic, English, and Turkish. It is available as an online magazine since 2009 at bahro.nu.

See also 
 Suryoyo Sat
 Assyrians/Syriacs in Sweden

References

External links
Official site

1979 establishments in Sweden
Assyrian culture
Cultural magazines
Magazines established in 1979
Multilingual magazines
Magazines published in Sweden